Edward Russell Gaines (3 November 1926 – 6 September 1994) was the Catholic Auxiliary Bishop of Auckland (1976–1981) and was the first bishop of the Roman Catholic Diocese of Hamilton, New Zealand (1980–94).

Born in Whanganui in 1926, Gaines received his secondary education at St. Peter's College, Epsom, conducted by the Christian Brothers. He then went on to study at Holy Name Seminary, Christchurch (operated by the Jesuit order) and Holy Cross College, Mosgiel (operated by the Vincentian order).

Gaines was ordained a Catholic priest on 13 July 1950 by Archbishop James Liston at St Patrick's Cathedral, Auckland. On 8 December 1976 he was ordained a bishop by Bishop John Mackey and served as auxiliary bishop of Auckland until 1980. On 19 June 1980 Gaines was appointed as the first bishop of the new Diocese of Hamilton.

Bishop Gaines died on 6 September 1994, aged 67.

References

 Dominic O'Sullivan and Cynthis Pier (eds), Turanga ngatahi: Standing together: the Catholic Diocese of Hamilton, 1840–2005, Dunmore for the Catholic Diocese of Hamilton, Wellington, 2005.

External links
 Hamilton Catholic Diocese
 Bishop Edward Russell Gaines, Catholic Herarchy website (retrieved 12 February 2011)

1926 births
1994 deaths
People educated at St Peter's College, Auckland
Holy Cross College, New Zealand alumni
Place of death missing
20th-century Roman Catholic bishops in New Zealand
Roman Catholic bishops of Hamilton, New Zealand